Stephen Kéki (died 1322 or 1323) was a Hungarian prelate in the early 14th century, who served as Bishop of Veszprém from 1309 until his death.

Ancestry and early career
Stephen Kéki was born into a lower nobility, which possessed landholdings in Veszprém County. They residence located in the settlement Kék, in the area of present-day Balatonfüred. His father was a certain Bedur (or Beder). One of his brothers ("frater") was Peter, who served as castellan of the episcopal fort of Sümeg in the period between 1318 and 1320, when Stephen functioned as bishop. His another brother was Egyed (Aegidius), whose name is mentioned as a canon (1312) then guardian (1316–1318) of the cathedral chapter of Veszprém. Egyed bought vineyards in Peremarton (today a borough of Berhida) in 1304 and 1312.

According to several historians, including Vilmos Fraknói, Dezső Véghely, Albert Gárdonyi and György Bónis, Stephen and his family originated from the powerful gens (clan) Ákos, based on an 18th-century biographical writing (Vitae Vespremiensium praesulum) by theologian János Róka. Modern historiography adopted the claim frequently. Historian György Rácz proved that an erroneously transcribed copy (by archivist Ádám Rajcsányi) of an original charter of 1307 – in which the diet at Rákos confirmed Charles of Anjou's claim to the Hungarian throne – caused the error; Rajcsányi incorrectly resolved the abbreviation "plts" ("praelatus", instead of "palatinus"), while the original text refers to the influential secular baron Stephen Ákos.

There are further uncertainties regarding his possible university studies abroad. Alongside György Bónis, historians Péter Haraszti Szabó and Borbála Kelényi claimed that Stephen is identical with that "Stephanus de Stephano", who attended the University of Padua with the title of canon of Padua along with Gregory Bicskei and a certain Stephanus Catastani in February 1296. According to this reconstruction, Stephen Kéki obtained titles magister and decretorum doctor (i.e. doctor of canon law) by February 1302. Returning to Hungary, he became archdeacon of Gyulafehérvár (1297–1301), while serving as vice-chancellor of the royal court (1300–1304). Aladár Szabó and György Rácz refused this career outline, distinguishing three or four clerics named Stephen at the turn of the 13th and 14th centuries. Accordingly, Stephen Kéki never attended any foreign universities. Sometime in the second half of 1298, Stephen Kéki was elected provost of Veszprém replacing Andronicus, who swapped his position in order to become guardian of Székesfehérvár. Stephen held the dignity until 1309.

Bishop of Veszprém
Following the death of Benedict Rád, which took place sometime after June 1309, Stephen was elected as Bishop of Veszprém in the second half of 1309. A truncated surviving charter of the cathedral chapter from that year already styles him as bishop-elect and provost. His election was confirmed sometime before October 1310, his first mention as bishop.

Stephen made an agreement with the cathedral chapter in 1313, during which he handed over to the canons half of the tax due to him from the peoples who had settled in Veszprém Castle for the purpose of defending the episcopal fort.

References

Sources 

 
 
 
 
 
 
 
 
 

|-

1320s deaths
Bishops of Veszprém
13th-century Hungarian people
14th-century Hungarian people
14th-century Roman Catholic bishops in Hungary